Lucrezia Beccari (born 18 December 2003) is an Italian figure skater.

With pair partner, Matteo Guarise, they are the 2023 Italian national bronze medalists.

As a single skater, she is the 2019 Italian national silver medalist on the senior level and 2018 junior champion. She has competed in the final segment at two ISU Championships – the 2018 and 2019 World Junior Championships.

Career

Early years 
Beccari began learning to skate in 2009. In 2014 and 2015, she competed in novice ice dancing with Pietro Turbiglio. In 2016, she was off the ice for several months due to an injury.

Competing in the advanced novice ladies' category, Beccari became the Italian national champion in March 2017 and took silver at the Rooster Cup in April, coached by Edoardo De Bernardis.

2017–18 season 
Beccari became age-eligible for junior international events and made her ISU Junior Grand Prix (JGP) debut in September, placing seventh in Minsk, Belarus. After winning the national junior title, she was selected to represent Italy at the 2018 World Junior Championships in Sofia, Bulgaria; she finished sixteenth overall after placing twenty-third in the short program and eleventh in the free skate. During the season, she was coached by Edoardo De Bernardis and Claudia Masoero in Turin.

2018–19 season 
Beccari decided to train under Franca Bianconi in Bergamo. Starting her season on the JGP series, she placed seventh in Kaunas, Lithuania, and fifteenth in Ljubljana, Slovenia. She then won three junior international medals – bronze at the Golden Bear of Zagreb, gold at the Warsaw Cup, and gold at the Denkova-Staviski Cup. Although too young for international senior-level events, she competed in the senior category at the Italian Championships in December. Ranked first in the short program and fourth in the free skate, she was awarded the silver medal.

2019–20 season 
In her final appearance on the Junior Grand Prix, Beccari placed sixteenth at the 2021 JGP Poland. Making her senior debut on the Challenger series, she competed three times at 2019 CS Lombardia Trophy, 2019 CS Warsaw Cup, and 2019 CS Golden Spin of Zagreb.  Beccari was fourth at the Italian championships and competed at several other minor internationals.

2020–21 season 
In an international season greatly limited by the onset of the COVID-19 pandemic, Beccari was the Italian national bronze medalist and won the Egna Trophy.

2021–22 season 
Beccari withdrew from the 2021 CS Lombardia Trophy. Following the cancellation of the 2021 Cup of China, Italy unexpectedly became the host of the third event in the Grand Prix, the 2021 Gran Premio d'Italia. Beccari was one of two Italian women assigned to compete at the home Grand Prix (along with Lara Naki Gutmann), making her Grand Prix debut with a twelfth-place finish. She was sixth at the Italian championships.

2022–23 season 
In the summer of 2022, Beccari had the opportunity to switch to pair skating after reigning Italian national champion Nicole Della Monica decided to retire following the Beijing Olympics, leaving her partner Matteo Guarise looking for a new partner to continue onward to the 2026 Winter Olympics in Milan and Cortina d'Ampezzo.

Beccari/Guarise made their international debut at the 2022 CS Warsaw Cup, finishing in fourth place. They won the bronze medal at their first Italian championships, and were seventh at the 2023 European Championships.

Programs

With Guarise

Single skating

Competitive highlights 
GP: Grand Prix; CS: Challenger Series; JGP: Junior Grand Prix Pairs with Guarise 

 Women's singles 

 Detailed results Small medals for short and free programs awarded only at ISU Championships.''

Senior results

Junior results

References

External links 
 
 

2003 births
Italian female single skaters
Living people
Sportspeople from Turin
21st-century Italian women